The Lengefeld Lime Works was a limestone mine southwest of Lengefeld in the Saxon town of Pockau-Lengefeld in the Ore Mountains.  In 2016, the mine was closed.

Geology of the deposit 
The Lengefeld deposit is located not far from the B 101 road, in the wood between the Heinzebank and Pockau. The only element of economic value is dolomitic marble, which is categorized lithostratigraphically as part of the Raschau Formation within the Keilberg Group. The material immediately surrounding the deposit comprises Lower Cambrian rock of the Raschau sequence, about 530 to 540 million years old. Feldspar-bearing muscovite mica-schist forms the basis of this sequence in which thin lenses of amphibolite are interspersed. The stratum of dolomitic marble has an average thickness of 50 to 90 metres. Host rocks include garnet-bearing and quartzitic muscovite mica-schist as well as interleaved strata of quartzite schist (Quarzitschiefer). As a result of the Variscan mountain building the once compact body of marble was split into five blocks known as the Altes Lager ("Old Deposit"), Neues Lager ("New Deposit), Tiefes Lager ("Deep Deposit"), Lößnitz-Lager ("Lößnitz Deposit") and Weißer Ofen ("White Kiln").

History 
The mining of lime from this deposit was first mentioned in a deed of enfeoffment dated 1528. This was a result of lease agreements or was a fiscal deed produced under the direction of the Royal Saxon Forestry Offices. In 1567, the existence of a quarry and two kilns is recorded in a deed of sale by the Barony of Rauenstein to Prince-Elector Augustus.

The rated quantity of lime produced per firing was 280 tons for one of the kilns, and 260 tons for the others. Lime from Lengefeld was used inter alia by the architect (Baumeister), Hans Irmisch, for the construction of Freudenstein Castle in Freiberg.

In the final years of the 17th century, the Scheibenberg pastor and chronicler, Christian Lehmann, praised the production of lime around  Lengefeld:

"By the River Flöha and its tributaries lie 3 noble lime kilns around Lengefeld, which are highly valued, because every year up to 3, 4 or even more times 300 tons of lime can be burned and the value of a ton on the spot is 8 gr." (original text: „An der Flöhe und ihren Einfällen liegen 3 fürnehme Kalck-Ofen um Lengefeld, die hoch æstimirt werden, dieweil man alle Jahr daselbst zu 3, 4 und auch mehrmahlen iederzeit auf 300 Tonnen Kalck brennen kan, und gilt die Tonne auff der Stelle 8 gr.“)
In 2016, the company Geomin closed the mine, because the deposits are exhausted. The processing plant remains in operation for the other quarry of the company in Hammerunterwiesenthal.

References

Literature 
 Jutta Sachse: Technisches Denkmal Museum Kalkwerk Lengefeld: Technisches Denkmal der Bindemittelindustrie im europäischen Raum. Sächsische Landesstelle für Museumswesen, Chemnitz 2001.
 Siegfried Biedermann: 475 Jahre Kalkbergbau in Lengefeld 1582 bis 2003. Stadtverwaltung Lengefeld, Lengefeld, 2003.
 Wolfgang Schilka: Kalkwerk Lengefeld: 475 Jahre Marmorgewinnung aus der Lengefelder Lagerstätte. In: Erzgebirgische Heimatblätter 25. Jg., 3/2003, pp. 9–13. 
 Lagerstätte Lengefeld/Erzgebirge. In: Marmore im Erzgebirge, Bergbau in Sachsen Band 16, Landesamt für Umwelt, Landwirtschaft und Geologie; Freiberg, 2010; pp. 81–89. (PDF 7,47 MB)
 Projektgruppe UNESCO-Welterbe Montanregion Erzgebirge: Umsetzungsstudie Kalkwerk Lengefeld. Freiberg, 2011. (PDF)

External links 

 Information on the Lengefeld site of the GEOMIN Erzgebirgische Kalkwerke GmbH
 Lengefeld Lime Works Museum
 Photos of the quarry at Panoramio.com 1, 2
 Photos of the „Weißer Ofen“ quarry at Panoramio.com 1, 2, 3

Pockau-Lengefeld
Calcium carbonate mining
Mines in Germany
Mining in the Ore Mountains
Erzgebirgskreis
Economy of East Germany
Museums in Saxony
Nature reserves in Saxony
Lime kilns in Germany